Sri Ramanjaneya Yuddham is a 1975 Indian Telugu-language Hindu mythological film, produced by Potluri Venkata Narayana and SBK Uma Maheswara Rao under the Lakshmi Narayana Pictures banner and directed by Bapu. It stars N. T. Rama Rao, B. Saroja Devi, Ramakrishna and music composed by  K. V. Mahadevan. The movie is a remake of 1963 Kannada movie Sri Ramanjaneya Yuddha.

Plot
The film is based on Hindu scripture Ramayana which shows Hanuman's devotion towards Rama. It begins with the crowning ceremony of Rama & Sita. Following, Anjaneya is unable to detach from his Lord as he is backed to Kishkindha. Here, Siva praises eminence of devotion when Parvati conflicts that power is greater than devotion which is the vital force. Parallelly, Kaasi King Yayati an advent devotee of Rama fails to attend the ceremony and is eulogized by Rama in the dream. Ergo, Parvati triggers, Maya the illusion to probe him who impels cruel beasts into his Kingdom. Anyhow, Yayati eliminates them and shoots at Maya when she turns into Matangakanya, enters Sapta Rushi Ashram, and asks for a pardon from Viswamitra. By this time, she becomes a victim when furious Vishwamitra is about to curse Yayati. Then, Narada prevents and states that the penalization of a culprit is the emperor’s job. 

So, Vishwamitra proceeds to Rama when crestfallen he edicts capital punishment and sends Bharata. Yayati obeys his order and moves towards Ayodhya. Shantimati the wife of Yayati with the children also starts to plead with Sita. Now Parvati feels proud that she has been vindicated. Hence, Siva creates a calamity in which they all part. As of now, Yayati lands up at Anjanadevi Ashram who gives blesses full-fledged life to him. Hither, Yayati replies he has no chance when she calls Anjaneya. Being unbeknownst he takes a vow on Rama to keep up his mother's word who crumbles affirming the actuality but stands firm. Siva rescues Shantimati, leaves her at Ayodhya, and the children are sheltered by Vasista. 

Meanwhile, Rama also becomes a despondent cognizant of Anjaneya’s oath. After that, Anjaneya sends Angada as an emissary to Rama but to avail. Subsequently, Yayati could not cope with the wrangling and attempted suicide. Whereat, he is shielded by Siva in disguise who enlightens Anjaneya that it’s an insult to his lord if cannot keep up his word. Accordingly, he attires war when Rama also moves and the two encounter when Rama fires his arrow Ramabanam and Anjaneya his devotional chanting Sriramanamam which colludes and leads to catastrophe. Parallelly, Shantimati seriously prays to Goddess Parvati, which melts her and comprehends. At last, Siva & Parvati appears stating it’s all done to evidence the Power of Devotion when Viswamitra forgives Yayati. Finally, the movie ends on a happy note with a proclamation that Srirama's chanting & Srirama's arrow will revolve around the universe to protect the wise and destroy the evil.

Cast
 N. T. Rama Rao as Lord Rama
 B. Saroja Devi as Sita
 Kanta Rao as Narada Maharshi
 Arja Janardhana Rao as Lord Hanuman
 Dhulipala as Yayati
 Mukkamala as Vishwamitra
 Sridhar as Bharatha
 Ramakrishna as Lakshmana
 Nagaraju as Lakshmana
 P. J. Sarma as Lord Siva
 Rajasree as Parvati
 Jayanthi as Shantimathi
 Hemalatha as Anjana Devi
 Manjula
 Suvarna as Maya

Soundtrack

Music composed by K. V. Mahadevan. Music released by EMI Columbia Audio Company.

References

External links 
 

1975 films
1970s Telugu-language films
Films directed by Bapu
Hindu mythological films
Films based on the Ramayana
Films scored by K. V. Mahadevan
Telugu remakes of Kannada films